Autokane or Autokana (Αὐτοκάνα) was an ancient Greek city of Aeolis located on a mountain of the same name in Asia Minor. It is attested in the third Homeric Hymn to Apollo, where it is mentioned as the name of a mountain. There was also a city with the same name through numismatic evidence consisting of coins dated to the 4th century BCE on which the inscriptions «ΑΥΤΟΚΑΝΑ» or «ΑΥΤ» appear. The site of the city is unlocated.

References

Sources

Populated places in ancient Aeolis
Former populated places in Turkey
Lost ancient cities and towns